James Ford Garden (February 19, 1847 – December 9, 1914) was a Canadian engineer and the seventh Mayor of Vancouver, British Columbia, serving from 1898 to 1900. Under his tenure the city developed a street car system, sidewalks, road grades and water connections.

Born in Woodstock, New Brunswick, the son of H. M. G. and E. Jane (Gale) Garden, Garden was elected a member of the Canadian Society of Civil Engineers in 1894. He was a lieutenant in the Intelligence Corps in the North-West Rebellion in 1885 and was wounded in the Battle of Batoche. From 1898 to 1900, he was mayor of Vancouver. He ran unsuccessfully as the Conservative candidate for the House of Commons of Canada for the electoral district of Burrard in the 1900 federal election.

He was elected to the British Columbia Legislative Assembly as a British Columbia Conservative Party MLA for Vancouver City in 1900 and re-elected in 1903 and 1907.

He died of a stroke at his home at 679 Granville Street, Vancouver.

References

1847 births
1914 deaths
British Columbia Conservative Party MLAs
Conservative Party of Canada (1867–1942) candidates for the Canadian House of Commons
Mayors of Vancouver
People of the North-West Rebellion
People from Woodstock, New Brunswick
19th-century Canadian politicians
20th-century Canadian politicians